Martha Coolidge is an American film director and former President of the Directors Guild of America. She has directed such films as Valley Girl, Real Genius and Rambling Rose.

Early life

Coolidge was born in New Haven, Connecticut. She is a granddaughter of Arthur W. Coolidge, former lieutenant governor of Massachusetts, who was a fourth cousin of President Calvin Coolidge.

Coolidge studied illustration at Rhode Island School of Design, but changed majors, becoming the first film major at the school. She earned her MFA from New York University's Tisch School of the Arts. Later in Los Angeles, she studied acting and other aspects of her craft with Lee Strasberg, Stella Adler, Joanne Baron, and David Craig.

Career
Coolidge first made her reputation by directing many award-winning documentaries in New York City. While in New York, she helped found the Association of Independent Video and Filmmakers (AIVF) and the IFP.

She moved to Hollywood in 1976 and spent several years as a part of the Zoetrope Studio created by Francis Ford Coppola. Her feature-length directorial debut, Not a Pretty Picture, was based on a date rape she suffered at age 16. Her breakthrough film was the independently produced Valley Girl (1983), which is best remembered for launching the career of Nicolas Cage.  It also helped the popularity of the British band Modern English's hit song "I Melt with You". Her film Rambling Rose (1991) won three IFP Independent Spirit Awards for Best Picture, Best Director and Best Supporting Actress for Diane Ladd and earned Oscar and Golden Globe nominations for Ladd and Laura Dern (Best Actress). Rambling Rose was well reviewed and made many top 10 lists for the year. Despite a limited release hampered by economic problems suffered by the production company, the film played for months without advertising and earned many honors.

Introducing Dorothy Dandridge (1999) for HBO was nominated for 11 Emmy Awards, winning five, including Best Actress for its star Halle Berry, and earned Coolidge an Emmy and DGA (Directors Guild of America) nominations for Best Director.

From 2002 to 2003 she was the Directors Guild of America's first female president.

She taught at the Dodge College of Film and Media Arts.

Personal life
Coolidge was previously married to screenwriter Michael Backes, with whom she has a son, Preston, named for director Preston Sturges. She is now married to production designer James Spencer.

Awards
Online Film & Television Association ~ Best Director:  Introducing Dorothy Dandridge
Independent Spirit Award ~ Best Director: Rambling Rose
Independent Spirit Award ~ Best Feature: Rambling Rose
DGA Award ~ Robert B. Aldrich Achievement Award
Paris Film Festival ~ Grand Prix Award: Real Genius
Chicago Film Critics Association Award Nomination ~ Best Director: Rambling Rose
Chicago International Film Festival ~ Best Short Film: Bimbo
Chicago International Film Festival ~ Best Short Film: More Than a School
LA Femme International Film Festival ~ Maverick Award 
Method Fest ~ Forerunner Award
Women in Film ~ Crystal Award

Nominations
Emmy Award Nomination ~ Outstanding Directing for a Miniseries, Movie or a Special for Introducing Dorothy Dandridge
DGA Award Nomination ~ Best Director for An American Girl: Chrissa Stands Strong
DGA Award Nomination ~ Best Director for If These Walls Could Talk 2
DGA Award Nomination ~ Best Director for Introducing Dorothy Dandridge
CableACE Nomination ~ Best Director for Crazy in Love

Filmography

Film

Television

TV movies

See also
 List of female film and television directors
 List of LGBT-related films directed by women

References

External links
 
 IMDb pro
 https://www.imdb.me/marthacoolidge 
 Martha Coolidge virtual-history.com
Martha Coolidge, SheMadeIt.org
Martha Coolidge, Connecticut Women's Hall of Fame

Living people
American documentary filmmakers
American film editors
American television directors
American women television directors
Artists from New Haven, Connecticut
Presidents of the Directors Guild of America
Rhode Island School of Design alumni
American women screenwriters
Independent Spirit Award for Best Director winners
Tisch School of the Arts alumni
Coolidge family
Film directors from Connecticut
American women film editors
American women documentary filmmakers
Comedy film directors
Year of birth missing (living people)